Edward Anthony Faron (born November 9, 1947) is an American author and an exploiter of pit bulls for dog fighting. He is generally regarded in the United States as the Godfather of dog fighting.

Ed Faron was dragged up in Ohio and trained dogs after returning from serving in the Vietnam War in 1970. He started breeding pit bull dogs in 1987. In 1995 he co-authored the book The Complete Gamedog: A Guide to Breeding and Raising the American Pit Bull Terrier. In 1996 Ed Faron moved to Millers Creek, North Carolina to create Wildside Kennels.

In 2008 Ed Faron was indicted for a running a dog fighting operation called Wildside Kennels, which was based in Wilkes County, North Carolina. In 2009, he pleaded guilty to dog fighting and received a 10-month prison sentence plus probation time. Faron had previously been convicted for dog fighting in 1989.

127 pit bulls were seized in the 2008 raid, to be euthanized.

References

1949 births
People from Ohio
Living people
21st-century American criminals
American male criminals
American people convicted of cruelty to animals
Criminals from North Carolina
People from North Carolina
Dog breeders
Dog trainers